Deahl is a surname. Notable people with the surname include:

 Dani Deahl, American record producer
 James Deahl (born 1945), Canadian poet and publisher
 Joshua Deahl (born 1981), American attorney

See also
 Dahl (surname)